is a Japanese wrestler and Olympic champion in Greco-Roman wrestling.

Olympics
Miyahara competed at the 1984 Summer Olympics in Los Angeles where he received a gold medal in Greco-Roman wrestling, the flyweight class. He received a silver medal at the 1988 Summer Olympics in Seoul.

References

External links
 

1958 births
Living people
Olympic wrestlers of Japan
Wrestlers at the 1984 Summer Olympics
Wrestlers at the 1988 Summer Olympics
Japanese male sport wrestlers
Olympic gold medalists for Japan
Olympic medalists in wrestling
Asian Games medalists in wrestling
Wrestlers at the 1986 Asian Games
Medalists at the 1988 Summer Olympics
Medalists at the 1984 Summer Olympics
Olympic silver medalists for Japan
Asian Games gold medalists for Japan
Medalists at the 1986 Asian Games
Japan Ground Self-Defense Force personnel
20th-century Japanese people
21st-century Japanese people